Electoral district of Ormond was an electoral district of the Legislative Assembly in the Australian state of Victoria.

Ormond was created in the 1958 redistribution, when Caulfield East (along with five others) were abolished. Ormond was abolished in 1967 when nineteen electorates, including Glenhuntly, were created.

Members

Election results

See also
 Parliaments of the Australian states and territories
 List of members of the Victorian Legislative Assembly

References

Former electoral districts of Victoria (Australia)
1958 establishments in Australia
1967 disestablishments in Australia